Artie Kaplan is an American recording artist, songwriter and a session musician. He has also been a music contractor where he was hired to musicians for sessions. In the 1960s, he was casting musicians for sessions for Aldon Music. When musician Joe Delia was asked about the best advice he had ever had, he said it was from Kaplan, who said "Always show up on time and bring a pencil."

Background
Kaplan is a singer-songwriter, producer and composer and the instruments he plays are saxophone, Clarinet, flute and piccolo. His saxophone playing and sax solos can be heard on over 150 songs that made it to the top 10. The songs he has played on are  "1-2-3" by Len Barry, "The Locomotion" by Little Eva,  "Mandy" by Barry Manilow,  "Breaking Up is Hard to Do" by Neil Sedaka and "Sunday Will Never Be the Same" by Spanky & Our Gang.

In 1972 he released an album with the title Confessions of a Male Chauvinist Pig. In a review, Billboard Magazine's Sam Sutherland referred to it as an eyebrow raising project that Chris Dedrick and Mort Ross were working on. His remark, possibly due to the name of the album was "no comment".

Discography

Singles
 "Harmony" / "God Fearin' Man" – Interfusion – 1972 (New Zealand)
 "Harmony" / "Stay Don't Go" – CBS – CBS 1189 – 1973 (Germany)
 "Bensonhurst Blues" / "Music Is Sweet Music in My Soul" – Riviera 121470 – 1973 (France)
 "Down by the Old Stream" / "I Wanna Go To Coney Island with My Grandma" – Paramount 0276 (1974)
 "Rock And Roll Is Here To Stay" / " Livin' Ain't So Easy" – Soedi – SOJ 640001 – 1981 (Italy)
 "Music Is Sweet Music to My Soul" / "Yours Is The Song" – Philips 6017 308 – 1982 (Netherlands)

Record album
 Confessions of a Male Chauvinist Pig – Hopi VHS 901 – 1971
 Down By the Old Stream – Paramount PAS-1019 – 1974
 My Name Is Artie Kaplan – K-Tel – TI 183 (Italy)

Record album compilation
 My Songs – CBS – S 65829 – 1973 (Italy)
 Greatest Hits – Edigsa – 01L0337 – 1982 (Spain)

CD
 Fun Time for Kids w/Artie Kaplan
 Confessions of a Male Chauvinist Pig 
 I'm Just the Singer in the Band 
 Barnyard Stories and Poems
 Down by the Old Stream

Songwriting
He co-wrote the song "Harmony" with Norman Simon which appeared on his 1972 album Confessions of a Male Chauvanist Pig. It has been covered by Ray Conniff and the Singers and appeared on their album of the same title.
Along with Artie Kornfeld, he co-wrote "Bensonhurst Blues" which was a hit for Dutch singer Oscar Benton. Other songs he has written are "My First and Only Lover" which was recorded by Nat "King" Cole and "It's Been a Long Time" which has been recorded by Eric Faulkner.

Session work

Singles
 Connie Francis – "My Heart Has a Mind of Its Own" – Soprano saxophone
 Neil Sedaka – Breaking Up Is Hard to Do – Saxophone

Albums
 Nat Adderley –  Sayin' Somethin'  – saxophone
 Janis Ian – Between the Lines – alto saxophone 
 Lonnie Liston Smith And The Cosmic Echoes – Reflections of a Golden Dream – baritone saxophone
 Janis Ian – Aftertones – baritone saxophone
 Janis Ian – Janis Ian – Flute
 Van McCoy – Rhythms of the World – trumpet
 Barry Manilow – Even Now – Musicians contractor in New York
 Barry Manilow – Barry Manilow II Van Morrison – T.B. Sheets – flute, saxophone
 NYCC – Make Every Day Count – contractor for horns and strings
 Dusty Springfield – Longing'' – music contractor

Links
 AKP Records

References

Living people
American male saxophonists
Singers from New York (state)
American flautists
American session musicians
American male singers
21st-century American composers
Songwriters from New York (state)
21st-century American saxophonists
American male composers
21st-century American male musicians
1935 births
American male songwriters
21st-century flautists